North Park Secondary School is a public high school located at the major intersection of Williams Parkway and North Park Drive in Brampton, Ontario, Canada. It was founded in 1978, making it one of the oldest high schools in the area. North Park is best known for being one of three high schools in Brampton to offer the IBT program, a program using business and technology to enrich the learning of its students.

Highlights 
It is also one of six schools to host the International Business and Technology Program.  This school has also hosted the International Co-op Program in conjunction with AFS (American Field Services), which has sent a selected number of students for one semester to Paraguay, South America for volunteer work.  The program has been hosted by North Park Secondary School since 1998 and has been a great success thanks to the work of Jon Ruhnke and principal Mr. Tunner.  After nearly 30 years, the school portapack was demolished in 2008 to make way for a long-awaited extension. As of August 2015, there were 1,359 full-time students attending NPSS. As of last year, a new club was brought to North Park called HOSA. The club seeks to diversify the learnings of North Park and tries to deviate from the business programs. Students enthusiastic about the life sciences can join the club which divides students into different events. Students in said events debate and learn about topics in their events that range from biomedical laboratory science to medical math. The culminating event is the Spring Conference hosted by HOSA Canada that pits students into competitions that test their abilities in tasks that relate to the event.

Clubs 
North Park Secondary School offers several different clubs which accommodate a vast number of students. The following are most of the clubs present in North Park:
Abstract Singers (choir)
Anime Club
Art Council
Athletic Council
Book Club
Viking Hacks
Culture Club
Debate Club
DECA
Eco Club
GSA Club
HOSA
Improv Team
Link Crew
Model United Nations
Photography Club
Reading Club
Robotics - 99000 
Running Club
Science Club
Sikh Students Association
Social Justice Club
Stage Crew
Student Activity Council (SAC)
Table Top Club
Video game Club
Zonta (Equality between men and women)

Sports/Teams 
North Park Secondary School offers many different sports teams such as:
Cricket
Badminton
Cross Country
Lacrosse
Baseball
Ultimate Frisbee 
Soccer
Volleyball
Basketball
Tennis
Rugby
Flag Football
Hockey
Kabbadi
Wrestling

SHSM (Special High Skills Major) 
North Park Secondary School offers a program for business students, which is funded by the government; students enrolled in this program do not pay for any of the events associated with the program.

Notable alumni

Cassie Campbell, former Team Canada Women's Ice Hockey captain, current anchor on Hockey Night in Canada on CBC.
Mike Harris, silver medalist in curling at the 1998 Olympics, CBC curling broadcaster and golf professional
Director X, music video director.
Shomari Williams, CFL football player
Christopher Moloney, writer and photographer

See also
List of high schools in Ontario

References 

Peel District School Board
High schools in Brampton
Educational institutions established in 1978
1978 establishments in Ontario